Jay Cameron Hooper (born 30 December 1943) is a Bermudian sailor. He competed at the 1964 Summer Olympics and the 1968 Summer Olympics.

References

External links
 

1943 births
Living people
Bermudian male sailors (sport)
Olympic sailors of Bermuda
Sailors at the 1964 Summer Olympics – Finn
Sailors at the 1968 Summer Olympics – Finn
Place of birth missing (living people)